The WhirlWind is a steal spinning roller coaster at Seabreeze Amusement Park in Rochester, New York.  It is where Quantum Loop stood until Winter 2004 when the WhirlWind was added.

History

The WhirlWind was manufactured in 2000 and originally operated as a traveling roller coaster. Whirlwind previously traveled Spain with Family Fraguas. It was painted orange and silver and operated under the name "Cyber Space" (different from the one that traveled Germany with Bruch and Kaiser). Before arriving at Seabreeze it was repainted blue and yellow (the same colors as the Spinning Racer that travels with Angela and Oscar Bruch).

References

Entertainment venues in Rochester, New York
Roller coasters in New York (state)
Roller coasters introduced in 2004